Denis Loubet is an artist who has worked on several pen-and-paper role-playing games and video games, including the MMORPG Ashen Empires.

Career
Loubet designed a set of miniatures called Cardboard Heroes (1980), a set of full-color cardboard figures for use in fantasy roleplaying games, published by Steve Jackson Games. Several more Cardboard Heroes sets were produced by Loubet, Jennell Jaquays, and Jeff Dee. Richard Garriott commissioned Loubet to paint the cover of Garriott's game Ultima I (1980), and Loubet painted many other covers for Garriott's games thereafter.

Atheism
Loubet is an active member of the Atheist Community of Austin and has appeared regularly on the live internet radio show The Non-Prophets.

Works

Origin Systems
Cover art, documentation illustrations, tile graphics, 3D sprite and model animations, 3D cinematic animations, etc.
 Akalabeth: World of Doom (AKA "Ultima 0"; actually published prior to the foundation of Origin Systems)
 Ultima I
 Ultima III: Exodus
 Ultima IV: Quest of the Avatar
 Ultima V: Warriors of Destiny
 Ultima VI: The False Prophet
 Ultima VII: The Black Gate
 Ultima VII Part Two: Serpent Isle
 Ultima VIII: Pagan
 Ultima IX: Ascension
 Ultima Online
 Worlds of Ultima: Savage Empire
 Worlds of Ultima: Martian Dreams
 Ultima Underworld: The Stygian Abyss
 Ultima Underworld II: Labyrinth of Worlds
 Ultima: Runes of Virtue
 Wing Commander
 Wing Commander II
 Wing Commander: The Secret Missions
 Wing Commander: Secret Missions II
 Strike Commander
 Crusader: No Remorse
 Autoduel
 Ogre
 Tangled Tales
 Omega
 Bad Blood
 Knights of Legend
 Times of Lore
 Deus Ex: The Conspiracy

Pixelmine Games
Co-owner: Promotional and In-Game art and animation

 Ashen Empires
 Dransik
 Underworlds
 Underworlds 2
 Super Collider

Pen & Paper RPGs
Cover art, interior art.

 GURPS
 Hero Games
 Car Wars
 Ogre
 G.E.V.
 Cardboard Heroes
 Killer
 Space Gamer Magazine
 Fantasy Gamer Magazine
Lands of Mystery (Justice, Inc.) (1985)
Swordbearer (1985)
Strike Force (Champions) (1988)

Blade of the Avatar series of novels
Interior art

 The Sword of Midras

References

External links
 Home page

Digital artists
Living people
Origin Systems people
Place of birth missing (living people)
Role-playing game artists
Year of birth missing (living people)